"Solo de Mí" (stylized in upper case; English: "Only of Me") is a song by Puerto Rican rapper Bad Bunny. The ballad was released through Rimas Entertainment on December 14, 2018 and its video features a woman lip-syncing the song while being physically hit.

Composition
The song "Solo de Mí" is a reggaeton and latin trap song and it has a tempo of 180 BPM.

Reception
The New York Times said Bad Bunny's voice sounds tender when he performs the song. Rolling Stone magazine said the song reflects someone who is "reclaiming herself" after being a victim of domestic violence. NPR noted the video was "part of a campaign against domestic violence".

Charts

Weekly charts

Year-end charts

Certifications

References

2018 singles
2018 songs
Bad Bunny songs
Spanish-language songs
Songs written by Bad Bunny